Marlene Slebsager also known as Lene Slebsager (born 1966) is a former Danish international cricketer who represented the Danish national team between 1989 and 1999.

References

1966 births
Living people
Danish women cricketers
Denmark women One Day International cricketers